Micheal Luck (born 21 April 1981) is an Australian former professional rugby league footballer who played for the North Queensland Cowboys and the New Zealand Warriors.

Playing career

Queensland
While attending Kirwan State High School, Luck played for the Australian Schoolboys team in 1999. He also attended Townsville Grammar School. His junior  club was North Thuringowa.

In 2001, Luck made his National Rugby League debut for the North Queensland Cowboys. He played 76 first grade games for the North Queensland club, mostly from the bench.  Luck played nine games for the club during the 2005 NRL season but was not part of the side which reached the 2005 NRL Grand Final against the Wests Tigers.

New Zealand
At the end of 2005, Luck moved to the New Zealand Warriors, seeking more playing time. In his first season for the club, 2006, Luck managed to play every single NRL game for the Warriors and won the clubs Clubman of the Year award. He played over 50 consecutive games for the club and made the most tackles for the club in 2007, again being named Clubman of the Year. In 2007 he was called into the Queensland squad as injury cover but was not required. He was named in Queensland's Emerging Origin side for 2009.

On 25 April 2009, whilst playing against the Melbourne Storm at Olympic Park, Luck made an NRL record-breaking 74 tackles in an extra time draw, 14-all, which was beaten a year later in Round 11 2011 by Shaun Fensom with 75 tackles against Canterbury-Bankstown. The previous record was held by Nathan Hindmarsh of the Parramatta Eels who had 69 tackles in a match in 2007.

At the end of 2009, Luck picked up the Warriors biggest award, the club Player of the Year. Luck claimed the trophy ahead of Manu Vatuvei and Sam Rapira.

In 2010 Luck became the 17th player to play 100 games for the Warriors.

On 14 September 2010, he was selected in the Prime Minister's XIII to play Papua New Guinea on 26 September.

Luck played in the 2011 NRL Grand Final against the Manly-Warringah Sea Eagles which New Zealand lost 24-10.

Luck announced on 21 April 2012 that he would retire at season's end (2012 NRL season).

Administration career
In 2012 Luck was appointed as the North Queensland Cowboys' elite pathways manager for 2013 and beyond, working to build local junior talent.

References

External links
Micheal Luck Official Warriors biography

1982 births
Living people
Australian rugby league administrators
Australian rugby league players
North Queensland Cowboys players
New Zealand Warriors players
New Zealand Warriors captains
Prime Minister's XIII players
Rugby league locks
People educated at Kirwan State High School
Rugby league players from Queensland